Neuroxena truncatus is a moth of the  subfamily Arctiinae. It is found in Ghana.

References

 Natural History Museum Lepidoptera generic names catalog

Endemic fauna of Ghana
Nyctemerina